Taylor Townsend (born  1996) is an American tennis player.

Taylor Townsend may also refer to:

 Taylor Townsend (The O.C.), fictional character on the FOX television series The O.C., played by Autumn Reeser
 Taylor Townsend (born 1963), American politician